Arunima Kumar, Sangeet Natak Akademi Yuva Puraskar awardee for the year of 2008 for Kuchipudi. As a young girl of 9, Arunima acted in the ballet Amrapali. The Kuchipudi Dance Academy formally launched her in 1995 where she performed her Arangetram at the Triveni Kala Sangam, New Delhi.

About
Arunima is a Kuchipudi dancer and a recipient of Sangeet Natak Akademi's ( India's national academy set-up by the Republic of India) prestigious Ustad Bismillah Khan Yuva Puraskaar for 2008. Currently she lives in London and is working as a HR Consultant at Aricent Group.

Start of career
Arunima started learning Kuchipudi at the age of 7 and had her initial training under Padma Bhushan Smt Swapna Sundari. She is a senior disciple of Padmashree Guru JayaRama Rao and Vanasree Rao and has been performing for over 15 years. As a young girl of 9, Arunima acted in the ballet Amrapali. The Kuchipudi Dance Academy formally launched her in 1995 where she performed her Rangapravesham at the Triveni Kala Sangam, New Delhi.

From then on Arunima pursued her art and has given several national and international performances at prestigious cultural festivals and venues.

Notable performances
Her notable performances include the Rashtrapati Bhawan (President House, Delhi), Sydney Opera House, Canberra Festival, Expo 2000 in Hannover and Lisbon, Nehru Center in London, Tagore Center in Berlin, Asian Arts Festival in Manila, Kuchipudi Convention in USA in 2008, Hyderabad Arts Festival, Kuchipudi Festival  etc.

She has also performed in several ballets like the, Chitrangada Ballet, where she played the role of Chitrangada; Nala Damayanti, where she played the role of Damayanti

Arunima has also been recognized with the Sahitya Kala Parishad Scholarship for Dance in 1998 and the Shringarmani title by Sur Shringar Samsad in 2001. She is empanelled as an Established artiste with the I.C.C.R. Indian Council for Cultural Relations, Ministry of External Affairs and is an A grade artiste of the All India Radio and Doordarshan.

Education
Besides dance, Arunima has also done good in academics. She earned a Bachelor of Arts degree in Economics from India's prestigious St. Stephen's College and then studied M.Sc. in Finance and Accounting from the London School of Economics.

She is also a keen pistol shooter and has won several medals in State and National Championships and is also the recipient of the Government of India Sports Talent Search Scholarship (1991–1992)...

Film, television and radio broadcasts and appearances
She is keenly interested in dramatics and has acted in a number radio and television programs Yog Yatra on Star News, music videos Euphoria, advertisements and short films Documentary on New Delhi, International film, Microsoft, Globus. She has recently done a cameo in a feature film directed by Prakash Jha – Rajneeti.

Kuchipudi continues to be her abiding passion, which she pursues with relentless devotion. 
Endowed with "a pair of large eyes, a mobile visage and attractive stage presence". Arunima is a devoted dancer with a promising career ahead.

Key achievements and work
 Ustad Bismillah Khan Yuva Puraskar conferred by Sangeet Natak Akademi, 2009
 Sahitya Kala Parishad Scholarship for Dance in 1998.
 Shringarmani title by Sur Shringar Sansa, 2004.
 She was invited to perform for the Hon'ble President of India at Rashtrapati Bhawan in June, 2006.
 Established Category Artist by the ICCR
 A grade artiste' of the All India Radio and Doordarshan
 Performed with over 400 dancers to break the Guinness book of World Records in Cupertino, California, 2008
 New Choreography – with Fusion band ADVAITA 
 Outstanding  reviews and dynamic profile have been featured in all leading television and radio channels (Doordarshan, Sony, Aaj Tak, Star News etc.) and newspapers including Hindustan Times, Times of India, Indian Express, Business Standard, India Today etc.,
 She features in the London School of Economics Newsletter for her outstanding performance at the Nehru Centre at London
 In an endeavor to share the joy of being closely involved with India's rich cultural heritage, she also worked for SPICMACAY, a voluntary cultural organisation as its Planning and Finance coordinator.  
 She is also an active sponsor and member of GATI, a young dancers' forum.
 She is building her own arts foundation to promote arts amongst youth, conceptualize and implement  projects in the field of outreach  – ARTS EXTEND - to promote peace and harmony across small towns and villages.
 She was also a speaker at Bridge India's webinar "Cultural diffusion across closed borders: India's Cultural Diplomacy in a lockdown" on Wednesday 1 July.

Notable international performances
 Indian Cultural Center, Kuala Lumpur, Malaysia, February 2010 
 KL Convention Center, Kuala Lumpur, Malaysia, February 2010

Recent performances in Europe
 Nehru Centre, London, July 2009
 Royal Opera House, London, July 2009  part of Akademi's Frame by Frame Seminar
 Dance India at Lowry, Salford, August 2009
 India Centre, Cardiff, August 2009
 Purcell Room, Southbank Center, 'Daredevas', November 2009
Upcoming performances in UK-
 Arena Theatre, Wolverhampton, UK, March 2010
 University of Manchester, March 2010
 Expo 1998, Lisbon, Portugal
 India's 50th year of Independence held in Bonn, Germany
 Expo 2000, Hannover, Germany
 ICCR tour in 2003, Ministry of External Affairs of India, in prestigious venues in Australia, including Canberra Festival, Sydney Opera House, Melbourne, Brisbane.
 ICCR tour Fiji, 2003
 Arts Festival Thailand, ICCR tour 2003
 Arts Festival Malaysia, ICCR tour 2003
 International Festival, Indonesia, 2004
 Asian Arts Festival, Manila, Philippines, 2007 
 India Week Celebrations at Nuremberg and Frankfurt, 2005
 Tagore International Centre in Berlin in 2005
 Nehru Centre in London, 2001, 2005
 International Kuchipudi Dance Convention in Cupertino, California in 2008. 
 Diwali Celebrations in London, Trafalgar Square from TAL dance group Southern Spice 2016
 Bloomsbury Festival, London 2016

Notable performances in India
 Amrapali ballet, 1987
 Rangapravesham at the Triveni Kala Sangam, New Delhi, 1998
 Hyderabad Arts Festival
 India Habitat Centre, 1998, 1999, 2003
 India International Trade Fair 1999, 2002, 2003, 2006 
 SOPAN festival by Sahitya Kala Parishad
 Delhi Tourism Festival at Santushti 2003
 Bharat Yatra Festival in lucknow 2001
 Shringaramani Festival in Mumbai 2001 
 Kuchipudi dance festival in Kuchipudi Village 
 National Choreography Festival at Habitat Centre 2003
 Qutab Festival in 2003
 Young Dancers Festival at Kolkata sponsored by Sangeet Natak Academy in 2004
 Legends of India Festival at Kamani Auditorium, Delhi, 2004
 Kalidasa Festival at Nagpur in 2004
 India International Center, 2004
 Habitat World in September 2005
 Virasat Festival at Dehradun in 2005
 The Mardol Classical Dance Festival at Goa, 2006
 Goa International Centre in 2006
 Biotech Conference in Hyderabad in 2006
 Nehru Centre in Mumbai in 2006
 Pratishtitha Festival where she played the role of Chitrangada in 'Chitrangada' Ballet, Habitat Center, 2006
  Ugaadi (AP Bhawan) Celebrations in 2006
 Jhansi Mahostav in 2006
 Chamba festival in 2006
 Mammalapuram festival in Chennai in 2007
 Jugalbandi with Kathak, choreographed by Pdt. Birju Maharaj at Holi Ke Rang Mahotsav (sponsored by Kalashram) at Habitat Centre in March, 2007
 Budh Mahotsav in Patna, May 2007 (where she performed the dance ballet Vasavadatta on Rabindra Sangeet Choreographed by her gurus)
 Jaya Samiti in Mumbai in June 2007 organised by Hema Malini
 Radha Asthami in Barsana, September 2007
 Indo-European Conference organized by ICCR, September 2007
 Fusion concert with Rock Band Advaita, September 2007
 Sahitya Kala Parishad young dancer's Festival, September 2007
 Neemrana Fort Palace in Oct 2007
 SAARC Band festival November 2007 
 JNU Delhi November 2007, 2008
 Delhi International Arts Festival December 2007
 HCL concert series, December 2007
 Haridas Sammelan, Mumbai, December 2007
 Legends of India Festival at Nehru Center, Mumbai, 2007
 Brahma Gana Sabha in Chennai January 2008 
 Nungambakkam Cultural Academy in Chennai, January 2008  
 Bhavbhuti Festival - Gwalior, February 2008
 Ustad Allauddin Khan Samaoroh – Mahiyar, Gwalior, February 2008 
 Nal Damyanti Ballet at Akhil Bhartiya Mahakavi Shri Harsh Samaroh, Varanasi, March 2008
 India International Trade Fair (Shakuntalam Theatre) on 20 November 2008
 State Day Celebrations at Andhra Bhawan, November, 2008
 Pune Air Force Station, Officer's Mess, Lohegaon, Pune on 14 January 2009 
 World Dance Day Celebrations, Habitat Center, May, 2009
 World Dance Day celebrations, India International Center, sponsored by Natya Vriksha, May 2009
 Ustad Bismillah Khan Yuva Puraskaar Samaroh, Sangeet Natak Academy, Delhi, September 2009
 Durga Puja Celebrations, Delhi, September 2009
 Khajuraho Dance Festival February 2010

References

External links 
 
 
 
 
 
  

Indian female classical dancers
Living people
1978 births
Kuchipudi exponents
Performers of Indian classical dance
Dancers from Delhi
Women artists from Delhi